Mickey Peters (born August 17, 1980) is a former American football wide receiver in the Arena Football League who played for the Tampa Bay Storm. He played college football for the Texas Tech Red Raiders.

References

1980 births
Living people
American football wide receivers
Tampa Bay Storm players
Texas Tech Red Raiders football players